Miriam Cruz (born Miriam Aracelis Cruz Ramírez, August 17, 1968, in Santo Domingo, Dominican Republic) is a merengue musician and actress. She is best known for being the lead vocalist of the successful female merengue group, Las Chicas del Can. In 1992, the group reinvented itself under the name Míriam Cruz y Las Chicas.

Discography

Studio albums 
Chicán (1985) 
Nada Común (1991) 
Nueva Vida (1993)
Punto y Aparte (2001)
Aquí Estoy (2006)
Siempre Diva (2013)
Me Sacudi (2015)
Miriam Collection (2016)
Sali De Ti (2017)

Singles 
"La Loba"
"Tómalo Tú"
"Te Propongo"
"El Ñoño"
"Me Siento tan Sola"
"Agua de Sal"
"Quiero hacerte el amor"
"La Guayaba Podrida"
"Me Muero"
"Quiero"
"Oye"
"Es Cosa de Él"
"Es Necesario"
"La Carnada"
"Esa Loca"

Honors and awards
 2013 Best Merengue Orchestra, Soberano Awards
 2014 Merengue of the Year, Soberano Awards ("Esa Loca")

References

External links
 Official website
 "Dominican Merengue, Cuban Rumba Named Cultural Heritages of Humanity", NBC News, December 1, 2016

1968 births
People from Santo Domingo
21st-century Dominican Republic women singers
Merengue musicians
Living people
20th-century Dominican Republic women singers
Women in Latin music